Chironominae is a subfamily of midges in the non-biting midge family (Chironomidae).

Genera
Tribe Chironomini
Axarus Roback 1980
Baeotendipes Kieffer, 1913
Beckidia Sæther 1979
Carbochironomus Reiss & Kirschbaum 1990
Chernovskiia Sæther 1977
Chironomus Meigen, 1803
Cladopelma Kieffer, 1921
Cryptochironomus Kieffer, 1918
Cryptotendipes Lenz, 1941
Demeijerea Kruseman, 1933
Demicryptochironomus Lenz, 1941
Dicrotendipes Kieffer, 1913
Einfeldia Kieffer, 1924
Endochironomus Kieffer, 1918
Glyptotendipes Kieffer, 1913
Graceus Goetghebuer, 1928
Harnischia Kieffer, 1921
Kiefferulus Goetghebuer, 1922
Kloosia Kruseman 1933
Lipiniella Shilova 1961
Lauterborniella Thienemann & Bause, 1913
Microchironomus Kieffer, 1918
Microtendipes Kieffer, 1915
Nilothauma Kieffer, 1921
Omisus Townes, 1945
Pagastiella Brundin, 1949
Parachironomus Lenz, 1921
Paracladopelma Harnisch, 1923
Paralauterborniella Lenz, 1941
Paratendipes Kieffer, 1911
Phaenopsectra Kieffer, 1921
Polypedilum Kieffer, 1912
Saetheria Jackson, 1977
Sergentia Kieffer, 1922
Stenochironomus Kieffer, 1919
Stictochironomus Kieffer, 1919
Synendotendipes Grodhaus, 1987
Tribelos Townes, 1945
Xenochironomus Kieffer, 1921
Zavreliella Kieffer, 1920
Tribe Pseudochironomini
Pseudochironomus Malloch, 1915
Tribe Tanytarsini
Afrozavrelia Harrison, 2004
Cladotanytarsus Kieffer, 1921
Corynocera Zetterstedt, 1838
Micropsectra Kieffer, 1909
Neozavrelia Goetghebuer, 1941
Parapsectra Reiss, 1969
Paratanytarsus Thienemann & Bause, 1913
Rheotanytarsus Thienemann & Bause, 1913
Stempellina Thienemann & Bause, 1913
Stempellinella Brundin, 1947
Tanytarsus van der Wulp, 1874
Virgatanytarsus Pinder, 1982
Zavrelia Kieffer, 1913

References

Chironomidae